Atyphella atra is a species of firefly in the genus Atyphella. It was discovered by Lea in 1921.

References

Lampyridae
Beetles described in 1921